Ludumo Lamati (born 19 May 1992) is a South African professional boxer who has held the IBO super bantamweight title since June 2021. As an amateur, he competed at the 2011 World Championships.

He was nicknamed 9mm after a semiautomatic pistol by his former trainer, Nick Durandt.

Amateur career
Lamati was involved in many fights as a schoolboy, which led a friend of his to bring him to a boxing gym to introduce him to the sport. He received a scholarship to train at the gym when he was 13. Lamati had over 100 amateur bouts, losing just ten of them. He competed at the 2011 World Championships, where he lost his first fight against Francisco Torrijos of Spain, as well as the 2011 All-Africa Games.

Professional career
Lamati made his professional debut on 10 April 2014, defeating Bongani Bhuti on points in Johannesburg. After compiling a 9–0–1 record, he outpointed Innocent Mantengu in December 2016 for the vacant African super bantamweight title. In his next fight, Lamati upset veteran Bongani Mahlangu for the South African super bantamweight title. He defeated former world title challenger Luis Meléndez three months later to capture the vacant IBF Inter-Continental super bantamweight title, and successfully defended it against Alexis Boureima Kabore that December. In July 2018 Lamati signed a promotional deal with Southampton-based Siesta Boxing Promotions (SBP). He only fought once in England during his stint there, however, beating late replacement Brayan Mairena on a SBP-promoted card in Bracknell on Saint Patrick's Day 2019. He made his return to South Africa on 28 July 2019, headlining a Rumble Africa Promotions event against Richie Mepranum for the vacant IBF Inter-Continental super bantamweight title. Lamati outboxed the southpaw veteran, forcing a corner retirement before the start of the 11th round to claim the IBF Inter-Continental belt for the second time.

Although he didn't fight in 2020, Lamati reached as high as number four in the WBC divisional rankings. He signed with South African promoter Rodney Berman of Golden Gloves Boxing in January 2021. On 19 June 2021, Lamati defeated José Martín Estrada García by majority decision in Kempton Park to claim the vacant IBO super bantamweight title, with the judge's scorecards reading 116–112, 115–113, 114–114.

Lamati faced Haidari Mchanjo on 22 May 2022, following a near year-long absence from the sport. He won the fight by unanimous decision, with two scorecards of 100–90 and one scorecard of 97–92. Lamati next faced Ken Jordan on 2 October 2022. He won the fight by unanimous decision, with scores of 98–93, 98–92 and 98–92. As he struggled to make the bantamweight limit against Jordan, Lamati moved up to super bantamweight for his next bout, against Mark Anthony Geraldo on 17 November 2022. He won the fight by a fourth-round knockout.

Professional boxing record

References

External links
 

Living people
1992 births
South African male boxers
Super-bantamweight boxers
African Boxing Union champions
International Boxing Organization champions
Competitors at the 2011 All-Africa Games
African Games competitors for South Africa
People from Mdantsane
Sportspeople from the Eastern Cape